The 2013–14 Scottish Cup was the 129th season of Scotland's most prestigious football knockout competition. The tournament will begin on 14 September and end on 17 May 2014. It is sponsored by bookmaker William Hill in the third season of a five-year partnership after a two-year extension was agreed, and is known as the William Hill Scottish Cup. The winner of the competition qualifies for the second qualifying round of the 2014–15 UEFA Europa League.

St Johnstone won their first ever Scottish Cup after a 2-0 win against Dundee United in the final.

Format and calendar

Thirty six clubs enter from the first round, sixteen from the Highland League, three qualifying Junior clubs and seventeen other clubs affiliated with the Scottish Football Association. Scottish League Two clubs enter in the second round along with the top two clubs from the previous season's Highland League and the winners of both the South of Scotland League and the East of Scotland League. Scottish League One and six Scottish Championship clubs start in the third round, while the remaining four Championship clubs and all Scottish Premiership clubs enter in the fourth round.

The calendar for the 2013–14 competition is as follows:

First round

The first round draw took place on 8 August 2013 at the Hampden Park, at 1:15pm.

This round is contested entirely by non-league clubs:
 Fifteen SFA full member clubs from the Highland Football League: (Brora Rangers, Buckie Thistle, Clachnacuddin, Deveronvale, Forres Mechanics, Fort William, Fraserburgh, Huntly, Inverurie Loco Works, Keith, Lossiemouth, Nairn County, Rothes, Turriff United and Wick Academy)
 Five SFA full member clubs from the East of Scotland League: (Burntisland Shipyard, Civil Service Strollers, Coldstream, Edinburgh University, Hawick Royal Albert)
 Three SFA full member clubs from the South of Scotland League: (Newton Stewart, St Cuthbert Wanderers, Wigtown & Bladnoch)
 Seven SFA full member clubs from the Lowland Football League: (Edinburgh City, Gala Fairydean Rovers, Preston Athletic, Selkirk, Spartans, Threave Rovers, Vale of Leithen)
 Three SFA full member clubs in other leagues: (Girvan, Glasgow University, Golspie Sutherland)
 Three qualifiers from the Scottish Junior Football Association: (Auchinleck Talbot, Culter, Linlithgow Rose)

Replays

Second round

The second round draw took place on 16 September 2013 at Hampden Park.

All ten teams from the Scottish League Two entered the competition at this stage, along with the champions of the South of Scotland League (Dalbeattie Star) and East of Scotland League (Whitehill Welfare), and the champions and runners-up from the Highland League (Cove Rangers and Formartine United).

Replays

Third round
Sixteen teams joined in the 3rd round: all ten current Scottish League One clubs, along with six Scottish Championship clubs.
The Third Round draw was conducted on 7 October 2013 at 1:00pm at Hampden Park live on official Scottish Cup YouTube Site.

Replays

Fourth round
All 12 Scottish Premiership clubs entered here along with the four Scottish Championship clubs who were exempt from playing in the Third Round.
The Fourth Round draw was conducted on 5 November 2013 at 12:00pm at Hampden Park live on Sky Sports News.

Replays

Fifth round
The Fifth Round draw was conducted on 2 December 2013 at 2:00pm at Hampden Park live on Sky Sports News.

Holders Celtic were knocked out of the competition by Aberdeen on 8 February.

Replay

Quarter-finals
The Quarter-finals draw was conducted on 9 February 2014 at Tannadice Park live on Sky Sports 2.

Replay

Semi-finals
The Semi-finals draw was conducted on 9 March 2014 at Ibrox Stadium live on Sky Sports 1.

Final

Media coverage
From round four onwards, selected matches from the Scottish Cup are broadcast live in Ireland and the UK by BBC Scotland and Sky Sports. BBC Scotland has the option to show one tie per round with Sky Sports showing two ties per round with one replay also. Both channels will screen the final live.

These matches were broadcast live on television.

References

External links

Official Site

Scottish Cup seasons
1
Scottish Cup